The 2015 Liqui Moly Bathurst 12 Hour was an endurance race for a variety of GT and touring car classes, including: GT3 cars, GT4 cars and Group 3E Series Production Cars. The event, which was staged at the Mount Panorama Circuit, near Bathurst, in New South Wales, Australia on 8 February 2015, was the thirteenth running of the Bathurst 12 Hour.

53 cars were entered for the race and 50 cars started the race, with two entries withdrawn following crashes in practice and the other due to drivers being injured in a road accident prior to the event. Katsumasa Chiyo, Wolfgang Reip and Florian Strauss won the event driving a Nissan GT-R Nismo GT3. Reip and Strauss had both come through the GT Academy programme.

The highlight of the race came in the closing laps. The Nissan had been racing conservatively all day, just staying on the lead lap and in touch with the leaders. Matt Bell led the field in one of the M-Sport Bentleys, ahead of Laurens Vanthoor in the Phoenix Racing Audi with Chiyo in third. Stefan Mucke and Dean Canto were also on the lead lap. There were a few late safety car periods, with the last leaving two laps of racing to the finish. Once racing began Chiyo took second at the first corner before taking the lead going up Mountain Straight. As Chiyo built a gap over his rivals, a battle developed for second place, with Bell ahead of Vanthoor and Mucke. Mucke passed Vanthoor for third going down Conrod Straight on the final lap before attempting to pass Bell at the final corner. Mucke made contact with Bell, sending him into a slide, while Vanthoor drove around the outside of both cars to take second place behind Chiyo. Mucke took third while Bell dropped to fourth.

Class structure
Cars competed in the following five classes.

 Class A – GT3 Outright
 Class AP – GT3 Pro-Am, for driver combinations including one unseeded driver.
 Class AA – GT3 Am, for driver combinations including two or three unseeded drivers.
 Class B – GT3 Cup Cars
 Class C – GT4
 Class D – Invitational (Production)
 Class I – Invitational (Non Production)

Official results

 – Scott O'Donnell, Phil Mauger, Lindsay O'Donnell & Hayden Knighton were unable to drive in the race following a car accident on the Thursday. Knighton & Scott O'Donnell were replaced by Frank Lyons (who moved from the withdrawn #69 car) and Chris van der Drift. 

 Note: Class winners are shown in bold.
 Race time of winning car: 12:00:11.0280
 Fastest race lap: 2:03.3091 – Markus Winkelhock

References

External links

Speedcafe's Ultimate Bathurst 12 Hour Guide, speedcafe.com

Motorsport in Bathurst, New South Wales
Liqui Moly Bathurst 12 Hour
September 2015 sports events in Australia